Dilan Yeşilgöz-Zegerius (born 18 June 1977) is a Dutch politician who has served as Minister of Justice and Security in the Fourth Rutte cabinet since 10 January 2022. A member of the People's Party for Freedom and Democracy (VVD), she previously served as a member of the House of Representatives from 2017 to 2021 and State Secretary for Economic Affairs and Climate Policy from 2021 until 2022.

Early life
Yeşilgöz-Zegerius was born in Ankara, Turkey, and emigrated to the Netherlands as a child. Her family is from a Turkish-Kurdish background and originally from Tunceli.

Political career
From 2014 to 2017, Yeşilgöz-Zegerius held a seat in the municipal council of Amsterdam. She was placed fourth on the People's Party for Freedom and Democracy list in the 2014 municipal election.

Yeşilgöz-Zegerius was elected to the House of Representatives in the 2017 general election. She initially served as her party's spokesperson for justice and security, but her portfolio later included climate policy and energy policy. On 25 May 2021, she was appointed State Secretary for Economic Affairs and Climate Policy in the demissionary third Rutte cabinet, serving alongside Mona Keijzer. On 10 January 2022, she was appointed Minister of Justice and Security in the fourth Rutte cabinet.

References

1977 births
Living people
21st-century Dutch women politicians
21st-century Dutch politicians
Dutch people of Kurdish descent
Dutch people of Turkish descent
Women government ministers of the Netherlands
Members of the House of Representatives (Netherlands)
Municipal councillors of Amsterdam
Politicians from Ankara
Politicians from Amsterdam
People's Party for Freedom and Democracy politicians
Turkish emigrants to the Netherlands
State Secretaries for Economic Affairs of the Netherlands
Ministers of Justice of the Netherlands
Female justice ministers